The sixth season of The Real Housewives of Atlanta, an American reality television series, was broadcast on Bravo. It aired from November 3, 2013, until May 18, 2014. It was primarily filmed in Atlanta, Georgia, with additional footage in Alabama; Savannah, Georgia; Athens, Georgia; and Mexico. Its executive producers were Lauren Eskelin, Lorraine Haughton, Glenda Hersh, Carlos King, and Steven Weinstock.

The Real Housewives of Atlanta focuses on the lives of Cynthia Bailey, Kandi Burruss, NeNe Leakes, Kenya Moore, Phaedra Parks, and Porsha Williams. During the season, the women frequently clash with Moore, while Burruss becomes engaged to her boyfriend Todd Tucker, and Williams deals with her ongoing divorce from Kordell Stewart. It comprised 26 episodes, all of which aired on Sunday evenings at 8:00 pm.

The season received generally favorable reviews from contemporary critics, who appreciated the growing tension among the Housewives. It received widespread media attention for broadcasting physical altercations between Parks' husband Apollo Nida and Moore's assistant Brandon Deshazer, in addition to a later incident involving Williams and Moore. As of February 2014, the series is the highest-rated installment of The Real Housewives franchise, and it is the most-watched series airing on Bravo. Despite not being released to DVD, the season was made available for purchase through the iTunes Store.

Production and crew
The Real Housewives of Atlanta was officially renewed for its sixth season on April 2, 2013, while its trailer was released on October 17, 2013. The season premiere "Bye Bye With the Wind" was aired on November 3, 2013, while the twenty-second episode "Final Curtain Call" served as the season finale, and was aired on April 13, 2014. It was followed by a three-part reunion special, which aired in separate installments on April 20, April 27, and May 4. The twenty-seventh episode "Husbands Revealed" marked the conclusion of the season; it consisted of the husbands discussing the season, and was broadcast on May 18, 2014. Lauren Eskelin, Lorraine Haughton, Glenda Hersh, Carlos King, and Steven Weinstock are recognized as the series' executive producers; it is produced and distributed by True Entertainment, an American subsidiary of the Italian corporation Endemol.

Cast and synopsis
Six of the seven housewives featured on the fifth season of The Real Housewives of Atlanta returned for the sixth installment. Cynthia Bailey continues raising her teenage daughter Noelle, while Kandi Burruss becomes engaged to her boyfriend Todd Tucker and begins planning her debut musical A Mother's Love. NeNe Leakes returns to Atlanta after living in Hollywood the previous year, and readjusts to married life after remarrying her ex-husband Gregg. Kenya Moore fights an eviction notice from her landlord, and takes an interest learning about her earlier years. Phaedra Parks continues preparing for her mortician's license shortly after giving birth to her second child, although she frequently finds herself in conflict with her husband Apollo Nida, who is additionally renovating their property. Porsha Williams is in the midst of divorce proceedings from Kordell Stewart, and struggles to regain her independence after their marriage.

 Williams leaves the reunion after a physical altercation between she and Moore. Burruss takes her seat later on during third segment of the reunion.
 Burruss's mother, Joyce Jones ("Mama Joyce") makes an appearance at the reunion. She is seated between Leakes and her daughter. Parks moves to the end of the opposite couch.
 Parks's then-husband, Apollo Nida, makes an appearance during the reunion and sits between Leakes and his wife.

Reception

Critical reception
The sixth season of The Real Housewives of Atlanta received generally favorable reviews from contemporary critics. Writing for Entertainment Weekly, Andrew Asare commented that "we're in for quite a season [of] divorce, strained relationships, and tested marriages and friendships" after the premiere episode. Danielle Henderson from Vulture stated that "it's the first episode of the season and I'm already riveted". Lauren Weigle from Heavy stated that "Kenya continues to twirl, Porsha gets wild in the club, Peter's club 'Bar One' goes under, Apollo and Phaedra have marital issues, Kandi and her mother are at odds over Kandi's wedding, and more. Kandi's mother accuses Kandi's fiance of having an affair with Kandi's friend. Nene calls Porsha a bad friend. Somehow Porsha ends up in the hospital. Fist fights ensue," and summarized her review by acknowledging that "this season is going to be crazy." However, Jodi Walker from Entertainment Weekly later criticized the series for insisting its disapproval of violence, despite its widespread promotion of the fight between Williams and Moore and ultimate decision to broadcast the altercation. In April 2014, Bravo renewed The Real Housewives of Atlanta for a seventh season, and additionally announced the spin-off series The Real Housewives of Atlanta: Kandi's Wedding.

U.S. television ratings
The premiere episode "Bye Bye With the Wind" attracted 3.1 million viewers in its initial broadcast on November 3, 2013. It later became tied with the fifth episode "Save the Drama For Mama", aired on December 1, 2013, for the least-watched episodes of the season. However, it reached its peak viewership with the fourteenth episode "Peaches Divided", which was broadcast to 4.63 million viewers on February 9, 2014. The season finale "Final Curtain Call" attracted 3.81 million viewers in its initial broadcast on April 13, 2014. As of February 2014, The Real Housewives of Atlanta is the highest-rated installment of The Real Housewives franchise, and is additionally the most-watched series airing on Bravo.

Controversy
The 13th and 14th episodes ("Pillow Talk or Pillow Fight" and "Peaches Divided", respectively) garnered significant media attention for broadcasting physical altercations among several of the cast members. Leakes and Moore found themselves in the midst of a heated verbal argument, while Parks' husband Apollo Nida and Moore's assistant Brandon Deshazer engaged in a physical fight. Burruss was later angered by false allegations spread about Tucker and notably delivered the line, "I will drag you in this, bitch!" to Malorie Bailey, Cynthia Bailey's sister, as she was pulled away from the incident. Rodney Ho from The Atlanta Journal-Constitution acknowledged the situation as "one of the most violent fights in the six-year history of the program", while Bailey commented on Watch What Happens: Live: "I've been on this show for four years and never, ever in the history of the whole show has anyone laid hands on each other."

While filming the reunion special at the Atlanta Biltmore Hotel on March 27, Moore implied that Williams was unfaithful during her marriage; after Williams called Moore a "slut from the '90s" and Moore yelled that Williams was "a dumb ho" from a megaphone, Williams dragged Moore across the floor by her hair. Moore was initially unable to complete a police statement because she was required to complete the reunion filming, although Williams was arrested and booked for misdemeanor battery on April 18. Moore later threatened to quit the series if Williams were to remain, commenting: "we've become angry with each other, we've threatened each other and gone to the edge. But at the end of the day, we know there's a line." Earlier in December 2013, Williams received additional criticism for comments made during the eighth episode, "Ghosts of Girlfriends Past", wherein she indicated that she believed the Underground Railroad was an actual railroad line.

Episodes

References

External links

2013 American television seasons
2014 American television seasons
Atlanta (season 6)